Substance Use & Misuse is a peer-reviewed medical journal covering substance abuse. It was established in 1966 as the International Journal of the Addictions, obtaining its current name in 1996. It is published 14 times per year by Taylor & Francis and the editor-in-chief is Stephen Magura (Western Michigan University). According to the Journal Citation Reports, the journal has a 2017 2-year impact factor of 1.132.

References

External links

Addiction medicine journals
Taylor & Francis academic journals
Publications established in 1966
English-language journals
Journals published between 13 and 25 times per year